Bi Bahreh (also Romanized as Bī Bahreh) is a village in Sivkanlu Rural District, in the Central District of Shirvan County, North Khorasan Province, Iran. At the 2006 census, its population was 578, in 134 families.

References 

Populated places in Shirvan County